Sarai Shishgaran is a town in Auraiya district in the state of Uttar Pradesh, India.

Cities and towns in Auraiya district
History of glass
Caravanserais in India